Zapusta  is a village in the administrative district of Gmina Olszyna, within Lubań County, Lower Silesian Voivodeship, in south-western Poland.

The village has an approximate population of 50.

References

Zapusta